The 2012–13 Mizoram Premier League (Also known as the Mahindra 2 Wheelers Mizoram Premier League for sponsorship reasons) is the 1st season of the Mizoram Premier League which is the third tier of the Indian football system and the top tier of the Mizoram football system.

Teams

Play-Off

Table

Fixtures and results

Round 1

Round 2

Round 3

Round 4

Round 5

Round 6

Round 7

Round 8

Round 9

Round 10

Round 11

Top scorers
Top scorers up to Round 11.

References

Mizoram Premier League
3